Global Cinematography Institute (GCI) is a film school that teaches new emerging technologies and concepts in the field of cinematography. Founded by Yuri Neyman, ASC and Vilmos Zsigmond, ASC, the Global Cinematography Institute aims to prepare filmmakers to take advantage of on-going advances in digital and virtual cinematography technologies through an expansive and comprehensive curriculum known as Expanded Cinematography.

History

Founders 

The Global Cinematography Institute was founded by cinematographers Yuri Neyman, ASC and Vilmos Zsigmond, ASC. Zsigmond emigrated to the U.S. in 1957 after graduating from the Film Academy in Budapest, Hungary. Zsigmond won an Academy Award for Best Cinematography for his work on "Close Encounters of the Third Kind" with Steven Spielberg in 1977. Neyman came to the United States in the 1980s from Moscow, Russia and went on to make "Liquid Sky" and "D.O.A." and more. Neyman and Zsigmond agree on the problems found in the field of current cinematography, and that a great deal of cinematographic knowledge is not being passed down, and as a result, cinematographers are losing power on-set and in post production to new emerging technologies.

Mission 

The Global Cinematography Institute is an educational research and development entity focused on analyzing, preserving and predicting the roles of imagery. The aim of the school's curriculum is to give cinematographers mastery of both art and technology, so that they can assert that control over the images they capture on set, or in the computer. Art is a core concept at the Global Cinematography Institute. "It is that mastery of the art side that separates the amateur from the professional", Zsigmond has said. Everyone associated with the school believes that cinematography is an art, and technology is simply a set of tools that help to accomplish that art.

Curriculum 

The school is organized in sessions, each teaching about 10 students at a time. Curriculum emphasizes "Expanded Cinematography" which teaches students the basic technological skills necessary to direct imagery inside the 3D worlds of special effects, animation and video games. The school's emphasis is not primarily on technology. GCI offers students classes in "Traditional Cinematography" and "Lighting and Composition". Classes offered at the Global Cinematography Institute include "Virtual Lighting", "Previsualization", "Cinematography for Small Budget/Indie Films”, “Virtual Cinematography", "On-Set Image Management", "Advanced Lighting for Feature Films", "Foundations of Lighting and Composition", "Digital Cinematography", "Career Management", and "Technology of Lighting".

Expanded Cinematography 

GCI uses the term Expanded Cinematography to refer to a curriculum of cinematography classes covering traditional and new concepts and techniques, including study in fields new to the cinematographer's profession, including video games, virtual lighting, previsualization, visual effects and more. "We are devoted to preparing filmmakers through Expanded Cinematography to take advantage of on-going advances in digital and virtual cinematography technologies," says Neyman. Elsewhere, he says "There must be further development of the cinematographer’s profession, making him or her a Cinematographer-Artist-Designer-Technologist who is able to comprehend and solve any tasks which modern production can put in front of them."

Teachers

Faculty 
Classes taught in parenthesis:

Vilmos Zsigmond, ASC (Lighting for Feature Films)
Yuri Neyman, ASC (Foundations of Lighting and Composition)
David Stump, ASC (Digital Cinematography)
Jon Tower (Technology of Lighting)
Sylvain Doreau (Cinematography in Video Games)
Fred Durand (Digital Lighting)
Ron Fischer (Virtual Cinematography)
Jay Holben (Digital Cinematography, Cinematography for Independent Films)
Bob Kertesz (Image Management)
Jason Knutzen (Modern Tools and Concepts of Digital Imaging)
Kyle Murphey (Virtual Cinematography)
Aaron Peak (Image Management)
Brian Pohl (Previsualization)
Christopher Probst (Digital Cinematography, Cinematography for Independent Films)

Visiting artists / guest instructors 
Haskell Wexler
Russell Carpenter
James Chressanthis
Stuart Dryburgh
Matthew Libatique
Seamus McGarvey
M. David Mullen
Sam Nicholson
Dante Spinotti
Theo van de Sande
Geoff Boyle
Zhenya Gershman

References

External links 
 

Film schools in California
Cinematography organizations
Universities and colleges in Los Angeles
Educational institutions established in 2012
Arts organizations established in 2012
2012 establishments in California
Private universities and colleges in California